Asakura Museum of Sculpture (台東区立朝倉彫塑館 ) or Asakura Choso Museum is a museum in Tokyo that showcases the sculptures and life work of Fumio Asakura (1883-1965). The art museum is located specifically in the Yanaka neighborhood of Taito, in Tokyo. The museum opened in 1967 after Asakura's death.

Early life 
Fumio Asakura was born in the town of Asaji in the Oita Prefecture in Japan. He moved to Tokyo where his brother lived when he was nineteen. Influenced by his brother's sculpting talent, Asakura attended the Tokyo School of Fine Arts (now Tokyo University of the Arts) which propelled him towards his sculpting career. He focused on realism and was influenced by the naturalistic works of French sculptors like Bourdelle, Mailliol and most of all, Auguste Rodin. His work includes both human figures and animals, especially cats, which he had a deep love for and was inspired by his own pet cat. He is now considered the father of modern Japanese sculpture.

Features of the museum 
The museum itself is actually Asakura's three-story home and sculpture studio where he taught young students.  The art studio was built of ferroconcrete, with a high ceiling and skylights to let in the natural light, and the walls painted a light-brown color for a warmer effect. The studio also served as Asakura's private school, the Asakura Choso Juku ("Asakura School of Plastic Arts") from 1920 to 1944, where he trained many young sculptors. The building includes the oldest extant roof garden in Tokyo, where Asakura's students learned gardening, growing radishes, turnips, and tomatoes, as part of the teaching process intended to sharpen their senses and familiarize them with nature. The third-floor Orchid Room was originally a greenhouse for Asakura's collection of orchids, but is now used a gallery to display works depicting one of his favorite subjects, cats.

The museum today 
After Asakura's death, his family opened the building up to the public, and ever since then it has been managed by the Taito Ward government. In 2001, the building was registered as cultural property by the government, and in 2008, both the courtyard and rooftop garden were registered as a national place of scenic beauty. In April 2009, though, the building was closed for renovations due to signs of aging in hopes of bringing it to the conditions it existed in during Asakura's life. The storehouse next to the building was removed let sunlight illuminate the building again. The walls of the residence were also restored using colors and materials that were used in the original building. The museum was reopened again in October.

References

Buildings and structures in Taitō
Art museums and galleries in Tokyo
Art museums established in 1967
1967 establishments in Japan
Japanese sculpture
Asakusa